Shane Curran may refer to:

Shane Curran (entrepreneur), Irish businessman
Shane Curran (footballer) (born 1971), Irish footballer